A Glass of Beer (Hungarian: Egy pikoló világos) is a 1955 Hungarian comedy film directed by Félix Máriássy and starring Éva Ruttkai, Tibor Bitskey and Elma Bulla. It is also known as A Half Pint of Beer.

Main cast
 Éva Ruttkai - Cséri Juli 
 Tibor Bitskey - Kincse Marci 
 Elma Bulla - Csériné 
 Mária Sulyok - Kincséné 
 János Görbe - Kincse 
 Kálmán Koletár - Kincse Öcsi 
 Éva Schubert - Gizus 
 Elemér Tarsoly - Juhász 
 Katalin Berek - Emmi 
 Imre Pongrácz - Laci 
 Sándor Peti - Jocó bácsi 
 József Kautzky - Bordás 
 József Horváth - Lala 
 József Petrik - Tatár
 Gyula Horváth - Dagadt 
 Lajos Öze - Seregély

Bibliography
 Brown, Karl William. Regulating Bodies: Everyday Crime and Popular Resistance in Communist. ProQuest, 2007.
 Burns, Bryan. World Cinema: Hungary. Fairleigh Dickinson University Press, 1996.

External links

1955 films
Hungarian drama films
Hungarian comedy films
1950s Hungarian-language films
Films directed by Félix Máriássy
1955 comedy films
Hungarian black-and-white films